The Limerick Leader is a weekly local newspaper in Limerick, Ireland. It was founded in 1889. The newspaper is headquartered on Glentworth Street in the City.

The broadsheet paper currently is distributed in three editions, City, County and West , with a small selection of content differing between the three. The newspaper also has a Monday tabloid paper, City based, with a cover price of 1 euro.

In the 1950s, the Limerick Leader bought a rival newspaper the Limerick Chronicle. The Limerick Chronicle was founded in 1768 by John Ferrar  who was a prominent bookseller and printer in Limerick. The Limerick Chronicle is the longest running newspaper in Ireland. In 2018, the Limerick Chronicle went from a stand alone newspaper published on a Tuesday to a supplement in the weekend edition of the Limerick Leader.

The paper is owned by Iconic Newspapers, which acquired Johnston Press's titles in the Republic of Ireland in 2014.

References

External links

1889 establishments in Ireland
Leader
Mass media in County Limerick
Newspapers published in the Republic of Ireland
Newspapers established in 1889
Weekly newspapers published in Ireland